RTI(-4229)-112 (2β-carbomethoxy-3β-(3-methyl-4-chlorophenyl)tropane) is a synthetic stimulant drug from the phenyltropane family. In contrast to RTI-113, which is DAT selective, RTI-112 is a nonselective triple reuptake inhibitor.

In vitro tests show a very similar serotonin transporter (SERT)/dopamine transporter (DAT)/norepinephrine transporter (NET) selectivity to cocaine, although in vivo behaviour is different:

"The nonselective monoamine transporter inhibitor RTI-126 and the DAT-selective inhibitors RTI-150 and RTI-336 both had a faster rate of onset (30 min) and a short duration of action (4h). In contrast, the nonselective monoamine transporter inhibitor RTI-112 had a slower rate of onset (30–60 min) and a longer duration of action (10h). The DAT-selective inhibitors RTI-171 and RTI-177 also had slower rates of onset (30–120 min), but RTI-171 had a short duration of action (2.5 h) while RTI-177 had a very long duration of action (20 h)."

The efficacy of cocaine analogs to elicit self-administration is related to the rate at which they are administered. Slower onset analogs are less likely to function as behavioral stimulants than analogs eliciting a faster rate of onset. Nonselective analogs are less likely to function as "reinforcers" than reuptake inhibitors that have DAT specificity.

In order for a dopamine reuptake inhibitor (DRI) such as cocaine to induce euphoria, PET scans on primates reveal that the DAT occupancy needs to be >60%.

RTI-112 has equipotent in vitro affinity at the SERT, NET and DAT, respectively. RTI-112 was not reliably self-administered, in contrast to the DAT selective reuptake inhibitors that were used in this study. In vivo at the ED50, RTI-112 had no DAT occupancy at all. At the ED50, almost all of the RTI-112 occupied the SERT at this dose. A significantly higher dose was required to get >70% DAT occupancy in the case of RTI-112; however, RTI-112 was still able to suppress cocaine administration at the ED50, suggesting a serotonergic mechanism was responsible for this.

References

Chlorobenzenes
Tropanes
RTI compounds
Dopamine reuptake inhibitors
Stimulants